The Jönköping Catholic Church is a church building in Jönköping in Sweden. Belonging to the Swedish Roman Catholic Church, it was opened on 30 November 1974.

References

External links

20th-century churches in Sweden
Churches in Jönköping
Roman Catholic churches completed in 1974
Jonkoping
1974 establishments in Sweden
20th-century Roman Catholic church buildings